Michael Zerang (born November 16, 1958) is an American jazz percussionist and drummer.

Career
Zerang's parents both emigrated to the United States from the Middle East; his father is Iranian and his mother Iraqi. He began playing professionally in 1976 with Kent Kessler and studied at Wilbur Wright College from 1977 to 1978 and Roosevelt College from 1978 to 1982. 

Zerang has played with Dave Rempis, Edward Wilkerson, Fred Anderson, Fred Lonberg-Holm, Jeff Parker, Joe McPhee, Josh Berman, Kent Kessler, Kevin Drumm, Scott Fields, Mars Williams, Tatsu Aoki, and Hamid Drake. He has also played with international musicians such as Axel Dörner, Fredy Studer, Hannes Bauer, Jaap Blonk, Mats Gustafsson, Mazen Kerbaj, Peter Brötzmann, and Tobias Delius. He has been a jazz educator at the Art Institute of Chicago and Northwestern University in addition to founding and directing the Link's Hall Performance Series from 1985 to 1989.

See also Winter solstice concerts by Drake & Zerang Duo.

Discography

As leader
 Improvisors (Kontrans, 1996)
 Redmoon Theater's the Ballad of Frankie and Johnny (Eighth Day Music, 1997)
 35 Grapes (19 Sown) (BoxMedia, 1998)
 Scratch Match  (Penumbra, 2000)
 Guts (OkkaDisk, 2007)

As guest
 Bull Fiddle with Kent Kessler (Okka Disk, 2002)
 Tales Out of Time with Peter Brötzmann, Joe McPhee, and Kent Kessler (Hathut, 2004)
 Transmutations with Yakuza (Prosthetic, 2007)

References

American jazz percussionists
1958 births
Musicians from Chicago
Living people
Jazz musicians from Illinois
FMR Records artists
NoBusiness Records artists
Okka Disk artists